The 2015–16 season was the 68th season in the existence of FC Steaua București and the club's 68th consecutive season in the top flight of Romanian football. In addition to the domestic league, Steaua București participated in this season's edition of the Cupa României, the Cupa Ligii, the Supercupa României, the UEFA Champions League and the UEFA Europa League.

Players

First-team squad

Youth players with first-team appearances

Out of team

Notes
During the season Jugurtha Hamroun used two numbers, 14 in European Cups and 5 in Liga I.

Transfers

In

Out

Statistics

Goalscorers
Last updated on 17 July 2016

Competitions

Supercupa României

Results

Liga I

Regular season

Table

Position by round

Results

Championship round

Table

Position by round

Results

Cupa României

Results

Cupa Ligii

Results

UEFA Champions League

Qualifying rounds

Second qualifying round

Third qualifying round

UEFA Europa League

Qualifying round

Play-off round

Non competitive matches

See also

 2015 Supercupa României
 2015–16 Cupa României
 2015–16 Cupa Ligii
 2015–16 Liga I
 2015–16 UEFA Champions League

Notes and references

FC Steaua București seasons
Steaua Bucuresti
Steaua